Fort Adams is a former United States Army post in Newport, Rhode Island that was established on July 4, 1799 as a First System coastal fortification, named for President John Adams who was in office at the time. Its first commander was Captain John Henry who was later instrumental in starting the War of 1812. The current Fort Adams was built 1824–57 under the Third System of coastal forts; it is part of Fort Adams State Park today.

History
The first Fort Adams was designed by Major Louis de Tousard of the Army Corps of Engineers as part of the first system of US fortifications. After some additions in 1809, this fort mounted 17 cannon and was garrisoned during the War of 1812 by Wood's State Corps of Rhode Island militiamen. The Secretary of War's report for December 1811 describes the fort as "an irregular star fort of masonry, with an irregular indented work of masonry adjoining it, mounting seventeen heavy guns. ... The barracks are of wood and bricks, for one company".

After the War of 1812, there was a thorough review of the nation's fortification needs and it was decided to replace the older Fort Adams with a newer and much larger fort. This was part of what became known as the third system of US fortifications. The new fort was designed by Brigadier General Simon Bernard, a Frenchman who had served as a military engineer under Napoleon. Bernard designed the new Fort Adams in the classic style and it became the most complex fortification in the Western Hemisphere. It included a tenaille and crownwork, a complex outer work on the southern (landward) side, designed to break up and channel an assault force. The fort also had a detached redoubt 650 yards south of the main fort. In the US, it is rivaled in size only by Fort Monroe in Hampton, Virginia and Fort Jefferson on the Dry Tortugas in Florida.

Construction of the new fort began in 1824 under 1st Lt. Andrew Talcott and continued at irregular intervals until 1857. From 1825 to 1838 construction was overseen by Lieutenant Colonel Joseph Gilbert Totten, the foremost American military engineer of his day. In 1838 Totten became Chief of Engineers and served until his death in 1864.

The new Fort Adams was first garrisoned in August 1841, functioning as an active Army post until 1950.  During this time the fort was active in five major wars (the Mexican–American War, American Civil War, Spanish–American War, World War I and World War II) but never fired a shot in anger.

At the start of the Mexican–American War the post was commanded by Benjamin Kendrick Pierce, the brother of President Franklin Pierce. The fort's redoubt, about 1/4 mile south of the main fort, was built during this war.

From 1848 to 1853, Fort Adams was commanded by Colonel William Gates, a long serving veteran of both the War of 1812 and the Mexican War. The fort's garrison was ordered to California and many of the soldiers lost their lives when the steamer SS San Francisco was wrecked, but not sunk, in a North Atlantic storm on December 24, 1853.

In a report of 1854 Fort Adams was armed with 100 32-pounder seacoast guns, 57 24-pounder seacoast guns, and 43 24-pounder flank howitzers. All of these weapons were smoothbore cannon. The flank howitzers were short-barreled guns deployed in casemates in the tenaille and redoubt to protect the fort against a landward assault.

From 1859 to 1863 the fort was in the care of Ordnance Sergeant Mark Wentworth Smith, a Mexican–American War veteran who was wounded at the Battle of Chapultepec. Sergeant Smith died in 1879 at the age of 76, the oldest active duty enlisted soldier in the history of the Army.

Civil War
The War Department was concerned about the political sympathies of residents in Maryland during the American Civil War, so the United States Naval Academy was moved in 1861 from Annapolis to Fort Adams. In September 1861, the academy moved to the Atlantic House Hotel in Newport and remained there for the rest of the war.

Among the midshipmen assigned to the Naval Academy while it was at Fort Adams was Robley D. Evans who was wounded at Fort Fisher, North Carolina in 1865, commanded the battleship  during the Spanish–American War, and later commanded the Great White Fleet on the first leg of its epic around the world voyage. Among Evans' classmates at Fort Adams were future Rear Admiral Charles Sigsbee, who commanded the battleship , and future Captain Charles Vernon Gridley who commanded the cruiser  at the Battle of Manila Bay.

In 1862 Fort Adams became the headquarters and recruit depot for the 15th Infantry Regiment.  This regiment, along with several others, was organized into a regiment of three eight-company battalions, with the 3rd Battalion formed at Fort Adams in March 1864.

From August to October 1863, Fort Adams was commanded by Brigadier General Robert Anderson, who had commanded Fort Sumter when it was attacked by Confederate forces in April 1861.

1870s upgrade
As part of a major upgrade to US seacoast defenses, in the 1870s Fort Adams' armament was modernized with eleven 15-inch Rodman guns, thirteen 10-inch Rodman guns, and four 6.4-inch (100-pounder) Parrott rifles. Three new emplacements were built for the 15-inch guns; the remainder replaced older weapons in the fort, of which all but 20 32-pounders were removed by 1873. For mobile defense, four 4.5-inch siege rifles, four 3-inch Ordnance rifles, and four 10-inch mortars were provided. In 1894, four 8-inch converted rifles were added in a new battery south of the fort.

Twentieth century

Endicott period
As time went by, the fort's armament was upgraded to keep up with technological innovations. Major kinds of ordnance used at the fort included muzzle-loading cannon in the 19th century, rifled breech-loading artillery pieces in the early 20th century and anti-aircraft guns during and after World War II. The fort received significant armament, in the form of batteries to the south of the main fort, under the Endicott and Taft programs from 1896 through 1907. These were to defend the East Passage of Narragansett Bay in combination with the new Fort Wetherill in Jamestown, as part of the Coast Defenses of Narragansett Bay.

The Endicott and Taft period batteries at Fort Adams were:

Batteries Greene-Edgerton, Reilly, and Talbot were built 1896–1899 and were the first of these to be completed. Battery Greene-Edgerton included sixteen mortars, all of which were at first called Battery Greene, but the battery was divided into two groups of eight in 1906. Battery Talbot, one of a number of batteries added on the East Coast at the outbreak of the Spanish–American War in 1898, included two 4.72-inch Armstrong guns. One gun of Battery Talbot is preserved at Equality Park in Newport; another is at Fort Moultrie near Charleston, South Carolina and was in Westerly, Rhode Island circa 1920–1977. An unnamed battery of a single 8-inch M1888 gun on a converted 1870s carriage also existed briefly from 1898. In 1907 two additional batteries were completed, Battery Bankhead with three 6-inch Armstrong guns and Battery Belton with two 3-inch M1903 guns.

Battery Greene-Edgerton was named for General Nathanael Greene of the Revolutionary War and Lt. Colonel Wright P. Edgerton, a professor at West Point. Battery Reilly was named for Captain Henry J. Reilly, killed in the China Relief Expedition near Peking on 15 August 1900, who previously served at Fort Adams. Battery Talbot was named for Silas Talbot, an Army officer from Rhode Island in the Revolutionary War who later became a Navy officer and commanded USS Constitution 1799–1801. Battery Bankhead was named for Brevet Major General James Bankhead, who served in the War of 1812, Second Seminole War, and Mexican–American War. Battery Belton was named for Francis S. Belton, who served in the War of 1812 and the Mexican–American War.

In 1913 Battery Bankhead was disarmed and its three 6-inch guns sent to Hawaii.

World War I
Thornton Wilder, author and playwright, whose 1973 novel Theophilus North is set in Newport, served a three-month enlistment in the Army's Coast Artillery Corps at Fort Adams during World War I. Wilder rose to the rank of corporal in the Army.

In World War I, Fort Adams served as the headquarters for the Coast Defenses of Narragansett Bay, as well as a training center in both world wars. The United States Army Coast Artillery Corps (CAC) was chosen to man all US heavy artillery in that war, as they were the only part of the Army with experience using big guns, along with a significant number of trained personnel. Four heavy artillery regiments and two heavy artillery brigade headquarters were organized at Fort Adams and served in France, with troops of Coast Defense Commands from Maine, Rhode Island, New York, and elsewhere as their cadre. These included two of the four US railway artillery regiments that saw action in that war (with French-made weapons) and their brigade headquarters. The railway gun units were designated the 52nd and 53rd Artillery Regiments (CAC) (originally the 7th and 8th Provisional Regiments), and the 30th Separate Artillery Brigade (Railway) (CAC) (originally the 1st Expeditionary Brigade). The 51st Artillery Regiment (CAC) (originally the 6th Provisional Regiment), 66th Artillery Regiment (CAC) and the 34th Artillery Brigade (CAC) were also organized at Fort Adams and sent to France, but only the 51st completed training in time to see action.

The two 10-inch guns of Battery Reilly were dismounted in 1917 for potential service as railway guns, but after considerable delay they were sent to Fort Warren near Boston in 1919 to replace guns removed from that fort. Eight of the sixteen mortars at Battery Greene-Edgerton were removed in 1918 for potential railway artillery service; this was also done as a forcewide program to improve the rate of fire due to overcrowding in the mortar pits during reloading.

Some sources state that Battery Talbot's guns were redeployed to Sachuest Point 1917–1919, a few miles from Fort Adams. However, Army records show that these guns came from Fort Strong in the Coast Defenses of Boston.

With World War I over, Battery Talbot was disarmed in 1919 and its guns sent to Newport and Westerly as memorials. At some time after the war three 3-inch M1917 anti-aircraft guns were deployed at the fort, supplemented by at least two mobile 3-inch guns (or possibly mobile 75 mm guns) on White truck or Ford Model T chassis. Battery Belton's two 3-inch guns were transferred to Fort Wetherill in 1925 to replace obsolescent M1902 guns there. This left the eight mortars of Battery Greene-Edgerton as Fort Adams' only armament.

World War II
In the Second World War a peak strength of over 3,000 soldiers were assigned to the Harbor Defenses of Narragansett Bay. In September 1940 the 243rd Coast Artillery Regiment of the Rhode Island National Guard was mobilized and sent to Fort Adams to reinforce the Regular Army's 10th Coast Artillery Regiment. The two regiments garrisoned several coast defense forts and anti-aircraft installations under the Harbor Defenses of Narragansett Bay. During the war, Fort Adams and most of the other Endicott Period forts in Rhode Island were superseded by new defenses centered on Fort Church and Fort Greene and their guns were scrapped. However, the previous anti-aircraft guns at the fort were replaced by two 90 mm guns with several 40 mm guns and .50 caliber machine guns. An Anti-Motor Torpedo Boat Battery (AMTB 925), with two 90 mm guns on mobile mounts, was also at Fort Adams by December 1943. As the war progressed, the number of troops was gradually reduced to about 500 by the end of the war in 1945.

State Park
In 1953, the Army transferred ownership of Fort Adams to the Navy, which still uses some of the grounds for family housing.  In 1965, the fort, and most of the surrounding land, was given to the state of Rhode Island for use as Fort Adams State Park.  In 1976, Fort Adams was declared a National Historic Landmark, in recognition for its distinctive military architecture, which includes features not found in other forts of the period.  In 1994, the Fort Adams Trust was formed, which provides guided tours at the fort and oversees ongoing restoration work at the fort.

President Dwight D. Eisenhower lived at the former commanding officer's quarters (now called the Eisenhower House) during his summer vacations in Newport in 1958 and 1960.

From the early 1950s until the mid-1970s Fort Adams fell victim to neglect, the elements and vandalism.

Through the efforts of State Senator Eric O'D. Taylor, in the 1970s Fort Adams was cleaned up and open for tours and was used for the filming of the PBS television miniseries The Scarlet Letter.  The tour program was cancelled about 1980 due to budget cutbacks by the State of Rhode Island.

Since 1981, the Fort Adams grounds have been host to the Newport Jazz Festival, and the Newport Folk Festival.

In the early 1990s, Fort Adams was subjected to an environmental remediation program which made the fort safe for public access. About this time, the Fort Adams Trust was formed to oversee public programs and restoration of the fort.

In 1995 the Fort Adams Trust began giving tours at the fort from May to September.  Since that time, the fort has had several areas of the fort restored as well as having its land defenses cleared of overgrowth.

In 2012, the park was the official venue for the America's Cup World Series in Newport.

Notable persons associated with Fort Adams
 Robert Anderson – Commander of Fort Sumter and Civil War general
 John G. Barnard – Army engineer, Civil War general and Superintendent of West Point.
 Alexander Dallas Bache – Army engineer and Superintendent of the United States Coast Survey.
 Pierre G. T. Beauregard – Confederate Civil War general.
 Simon Bernard – French army general, military engineer under Napoleon and designer of Fort Adams.
 Ambrose Burnside – Civil War general, Governor of Rhode Island and United States Senator.
 Fox Conner – AEF Operations Officer in the First World War and mentor to General and President Dwight Eisenhower.
 George W. Cullum – Civil War general and Superintendent of West Point.
 Henry A. du Pont – Medal of Honor recipient, president of the Wilmington & Northern Railroad Company and United States Senator.
 Dwight Eisenhower – Vacationed at Fort Adams while he was president.
 William P. Ennis – Army lieutenant general born at Fort Adams.
 Robley D. Evans – Navy rear admiral and commander of the Great White Fleet.
 John G. Foster – Civil War general.
 William Gates – long serving Army officer.
 John Henry – First commander of Fort Adams and adventurer.
 Henry Jackson Hunt – Civil War general and artillery commander at the Battle of Gettysburg.
 Lyman Lemnitzer – Army general and Chairman of the Joint Chiefs of Staff.
 John B. Magruder – Confederate Civil War general.
 Franklin Pierce – General, Senator and President of the United States.
 William S. Rosecrans – Civil War general.
 Isaac Ingalls Stevens – Civil War general.
 Thomas W. Sherman – Civil War general.
 Joseph G. Totten – Oversaw construction of Fort Adams and Chief Engineer of the United States Army.
 Louis de Tousard – Revolutionary War hero and designer of the first Fort Adams.
 Thornton Wilder – Author. Parts of his book Theophilus North were inspired by his experiences while stationed at Fort Adams during the First World War.
 William Griffith Wilson – Best known as "Bill W". Founder of Alcoholics Anonymous. Stationed at Fort Adams during the First World War.

Gallery

See also

 10th Coast Artillery (United States)
 United States Army Coast Artillery Corps
 Seacoast defense in the United States
 Naval Station Newport
 List of National Historic Landmarks in Rhode Island
 National Register of Historic Places listings in Newport County, Rhode Island

References

Bibliography

External links

 
 Fort Adams at FortWiki
 Fort Adams, Newport Neck, Newport, Newport, RI at the Historic American Engineering Record (HAER)
 Fort Tours: Fort Adams, RI
Report on the Restoration of Fort Adams II prepared by William B. Robinson from the Rhode Island State Archives

Adams
State parks of Rhode Island
Adams
Mexican–American War forts
Rhode Island in the American Civil War
Adams
National Historic Landmarks in Rhode Island
1799 establishments in Rhode Island
Buildings and structures in Newport, Rhode Island
Museums in Newport, Rhode Island
Military and war museums in Rhode Island
Adams
Historic districts on the National Register of Historic Places in Rhode Island
National Register of Historic Places in Newport, Rhode Island
1953 disestablishments in Rhode Island
Military installations established in 1799